Guyon is a French surname.

Geographical distribution
As of 2014, 85.7% of all known bearers of the surname Guyon were residents of France (frequency 1:4,367), 4.8% of the United States (1:427,011), 2.4% of Canada (1:87,614), 1.7% of the Philippines (1:327,626) and 1.1% of Gabon (1:9,351).

In France, the frequency of the surname was higher than national average (1:4,367) in the following regions:
 1. Bourgogne-Franche-Comté (1:1,012)
 2. Pays de la Loire (1:1,802)
 3. Centre-Val de Loire (1:2,925)
 4. Brittany (1:3,370)
 5. Auvergne-Rhône-Alpes (1:3,951)
 6. Corsica (1:4,330)

People
Adrien Guyon (1866–?), French Olympic fencer
Alexandre Guyon (1829–1905), French actor
Isabelle Guyon (born 1961), French-born researcher in machine learning
James Guyon Jr. (1778–1846), politician and cavalry officer from Staten Island, New York
Jean Guyon du Buisson (1592–1663), master mason and early settler of Quebec, Canada
Jean Casimir Félix Guyon (1831–1920), French urologist at the University of Paris
Jean-Jacques Guyon (1932–2017), French Olympic equestrian
Jeanne Guyon (1648–1717), French Christian mystic
Joe Guyon (1892–1971), American professional football player and coach
Lionel Guyon, French Olympic equestrian
Marie-Therese Guyon Cadillac (1671–1746), early settler of Detroit, Michigan
Maxime Guyon (born 1989), French jockey
Maximilienne Guyon (1868–1903), French painter and illustrator
Olivier Guyon (born 1975), French-American astronomer
Pascal Guyon, French musician
René Guyon (1876–1963), French jurist and sexual ethicist
Richard Guyon (1813–1856), general in the Hungarian revolutionary army
Sir Guyon, fictional hero in Edmund Spencer's The Faerie Queene (1590)

See also
Guion (name), a variant spelling

References

French-language surnames
Surnames of French origin